The Gypsey Race is a winterbourne stream that rises to the east of Wharram-le-Street and flows through the villages of Duggleby, Kirby Grindalythe, West Lutton, East Lutton, Helperthorpe, Weaverthorpe, Butterwick, Foxholes, Wold Newton, Burton Fleming, Rudston and Boynton. The stream flows into the North Sea in Bridlington harbour. It is the most northerly of the Yorkshire chalk streams.

The Gypsey Race rises in the Great Wold Valley through a series of springs and flows intermittently between Duggleby and West Lutton where it runs underground in the chalk aquifer before re-surfacing in Rudston. Water from the aquifer running between West Lutton and Wold Newton also heads south to re-appear at Elmswell feeding West Beck and the River Hull.

According to folklore, when the Gypsey Race is flowing in flood (The Woe Waters), bad fortune is at hand.  It was in flood in the year before the Great Plague of 1665–66, the restoration of Charles II (1660) and the landing of William of Orange (1688), before both World War One and World War Two, plus the bad winters of 1947 and 1962.

Villagers in Boynton have an annual duck race on the stream in May. Hundreds of yellow plastic ducks are paid for and race the Race in aid of funds for the village hall.

Pictures

Notes

References

External links

Rivers of North Yorkshire
Rivers of the East Riding of Yorkshire
Yorkshire Wolds